William Dudley (died 1483) was Dean of Windsor and then Bishop of Durham.

Born William Sutton, of Dudley, he was a younger son of John Sutton, 1st Baron Dudley. He was made a canon of St George's Chapel, Windsor and Dean of the Chapel Royal in 1471 and elevated to Dean of Windsor in 1473, a position which he held with that of Dean of Wolverhampton: thereafter the two posts were customarily held by the same man.

Dudley was nominated to Durham on 31 July 1476 and was consecrated between 1 September and 12 October 1476. In 1483 he supported Richard, Duke of Gloucester, the future King Richard III, in his bid for the Throne of England. In the last months of his life he was Chancellor of Oxford University. Dudley died on 29 November 1483.

Citations

References

 
Loades, David (1996): John Dudley, Duke of Northumberland 1504–1553, Oxford: Clarendon Press, 
Ross, Charles (1981): Richard III, Berkeley: University of California Press, 

1483 deaths
Canons of Windsor
Deans of Windsor
Bishops of Durham
15th-century English Roman Catholic bishops
Chancellors of the University of Oxford
William
Deans of Wolverhampton
Deans of the Chapel Royal
Year of birth unknown